Kona Expressway (part of NH12, not to be confused with Kona Highroad or NH117) is a 6 lane  grade-separated, tolled expressway in the suburban fringes of Kolkata, West Bengal. It is one of the most important entries to Kolkata. As of November 2022, the road carries more 70,000 vehicles per day. The road links National Highway 16 (India) (NH 16) near Kona, Nibra to Vivekananda Setu, which leads to Kolkata. The expressway is part of NH 12.

Route
Kona Expressway entirely lies in the Howrah district and comes under the Howrah Municipal Corporation. The route was opened in 2001. Kona Expressway is significant since it is one of the three and major route to enter in Kolkata. The route goes through major areas like Carry road, which is the connector to Andul road, an important route of Howrah parallel to Kona Expressway. At Belepole, the Drainage Canal road connects with Kona Expressway, which is a major route to Howrah Maidan and Howrah-Amta road. Also the route acts as major connector to the areas like Santragachi, Jagacha, Gorpha, Belepole etc. Though the route is six lanes (four major lanes and two service roads) but it becomes two lanes on Santragachi over-bridge which crosses over Santragachi jheel and rail lines.

The route passes along two major inter-city railway junctions namely, Santragachi Junction railway station in Santragachi and Shalimar railway station near Vidyasagar Setu toll centre. Santragachi junction railway station is the third largest station in Kolkata Metropolitan area. Santragachi bus terminus is also along the route, which is used as inter-city bus terminus for Kolkata and long distance buses. Kona Expressway serves as the route of buses like Barasat-Newtown-Santragachi, Barasat-Ultadanga-Santragachi, KB15 (Santragachi-Anandapur), EB1A (to Belgharia), VS12 (to New Town), K11 (Domjur - Rabindra Sadan), 26 (Mini) (Unsani - Esplanade), C11 (Domjur - B.B.D. Bagh/Belgachia), E6 (Amta - Esplanade), E7 (Bagnan - Esplanade) etc.

The route was previously a part of NH 117 and a connector to NH 6.

References

Expressways in West Bengal
Transport in Kolkata